Sabanetas is a barrio in the municipality of Mayagüez, Puerto Rico. Its population in 2010 was 4,005.

History
Puerto Rico was ceded by Spain in the aftermath of the Spanish–American War under the terms of the Treaty of Paris of 1898 and became an unincorporated territory of the United States. In 1899, the United States Department of War conducted a census of Puerto Rico finding that the population of Sabanetas barrio was 1,401.

Name
Sabanetas Barrio is a coastal rural and riverside barrio, which borders the municipality of Añasco to the north.  It derives its name from the plains or savannas found in the northern beaches of Mayagüez, in front of the Mona Channel, and in the vicinity of the mouth of the river now called the Río Grande de Añasco. It is one of two barrios in Mayagüez whose jurisdiction extends from the main island, because its jurisdiction includes the hilly island of Desecheo, whose name is a Taino name which means "hilly land". "Eta" in the "Sabana" noun suffix means an indicative of the extent of these savannas is limited in nature, as indeed it is, because it is located among the sea of the West Indies, the Goaorabo River, the swamp of the convent, the caño of La Boquilla and the hills of Algarrobos and Miradero.

Notable landmarks
Sabanetas is home the El Mani community.  Inside Sabanetas barrio the El Mani Pavilion is located, where the handball events were held for the 2010 Central American and Caribbean Games.  The Boquilla Creek Wildlife Reserve (Reserva Natural del Caño de la Boquilla) is also located in Sabanetas.  Also the Desecheo National Wildlife Refuge.  The Eugenio María de Hostos Airport regional airport is located inside the boundaries of the barrio.

Gallery

See also

 List of communities in Puerto Rico

References

Barrios of Mayagüez, Puerto Rico